Anthony O'Connor may refer to:

 Anthony O'Connor (cricketer)
 Anthony O'Connor (footballer)